Ali Kaaf (born 1977) is a Syrian-born German visual artist. His artistic style focuses on pictorial language, and works to connect the worlds of Beirut, Berlin, and the United States.

Education 
Kaaf studied Visual Art from 1994 to 1998 at the Institut des Beaux-Arts in Beirut; and at the Universität der Künste Berlin (UdK) from 2000 to 2005. He studied under professors Marwan Kassab-Bachi and Rebecca Horn.

Career
Kaaf is influenced by European and Arab cultures and art traditions. His abstract art is inspired by important locations in his life—Damascus, Beirut, and Berlin—and concepts such as Sufi mysticism and Islamic philosophy. Balance between meditation and returning to everyday life is part of the artist’s thinking and is directly inscribed in his artistic activity.

Kaaf’s work comprises various artistic disciplines, from drawing and photography through glass sculpture, sound, and video to room installation. He primarily works with paper and ink.

He finds his European role models in Classical Modernism and the avant-garde of the 1960s: works like his series The Byzantine Corner were inspired by Henri Matisse’s paper cutouts and the collages of the Dadaists. Influences from his delving into the German art movement ZERO are recognizable. The principle of removal and readdition is characteristic of his working method. The works display their form language in relation to point and line, surface and depth, black and white, surfaces and forms, rhythm, fire, erosion, and light and shadow. Kaaf’s abstractions are the result of his intense dealings with script, architecture, and history.

Kaaf’s works engage in dialogue with cultures and disciplines and, beyond them, through interdisciplinary collaborations, to Gesamtkunstwerke, syntheses of the arts. Examples include a 2018 video installation on 48 Variations for Two Pianos by John McGuire (Festival ME_MMIX 2018) in the Es Baluard Museum for Modern and Contemporary Art in Palma; in 2015, Intima, a dance project in collaboration with Dawson Dance SF and the choreographer David Dawson, San Francisco, and the composers Ashraf Kateb and Kinan Azmeh; and his recurrent collaboration since 2011 with the glassblower James Mongrain in Seattle; the products are flowing sculptural forms cooled to glass with titles like Helmet, Tattoo, and Larynx (2014), which correspond with his works on paper (Rift, Dress, Wall, and Burn Trace).

Kaaf presents his work in artist talks, lectures, and workshops, at institutions like Montana State University Billings and at the symposium on Syria and Yemen: making art today with Anna Wallace-Thompson, Buthayna Ali, Fadi Yazigi, and Kevork Mourad in the British Museum in London in 2019. The Artist in Residence Program of Germany’s Foreign Ministry in cooperation with the Regional Association of Berlin Galleries, awarded to Kaaf in 2020, is the first in-house residence program of a German ministry. It is open to selected artists who come from abroad or whose work focuses intensely on the world outside Germany.

Kaaf’s works are found in private and public collections all over the world, for example in the Darat Al Funun – The Khalid Shoman Foundation in Amman, in the Solidere Collection Beirut, in the MAXXI, the Italian National Museum for Art of the 21st Century (Museo nazionale delle arti del XXI secolo) in Rome, the Moontower Foundation in Bad König, the Museum for Islamic Art in Berlin, and the Peter Raue collection in Berlin.

Awards and residencies 
 2020 Artist in Residence, Ministry of Foreign Affairs and Landesverband Berliner Galerien (LVBG), Berlin, Germany
 2015 Artist-in-Residence, Kala Art Institute, Berkeley, California, USA
 2014 Honorary AIR Awardees, Kala Art Institute, Berkeley, California, USA
 2010 Young Collectors for MAXXI 2010, Young Collectors Association - Fair ROMA, The Road to Contemporary Art, Rome, Italy
 2005–2006 Solidere's Artists in Residence Program, Beirut, Lebanon
 2004 German Academic Exchange Service (DAAD). The prize for Outstanding International Students, assigned by UdK Berlin, Germany

References

External links 
 Official website
 Ali Kaaf at the platform for contemporary Arab artists

1977 births
Living people
People from Berlin
Berlin University of the Arts alumni
20th-century German artists
21st-century German artists
German contemporary artists